DZS, formerly Zhone Technologies and DASAN Zhone Solutions, is a provider of telecommunications networking equipment founded in 1999. It is headquartered in Plano. DZS is ISO 9001:2008 certified in the manufacture and service of telecommunications equipment.

Corporate history 
Zhone was founded in September 1999 by former executives of Ascend Communications Jeanette Symons, Mory Ejabat and Robert Dahl.

Acquisitions 
Zhone acquired more than a dozen companies, including:
 Adaptive Spectrum and Signal Alignment, Inc. (ASSIA)  
 Paradyne Networks, September 2005, Internet access
 Sorrento Networks, July 2004, Metro optical access
 Gluon Networks, February 2004,  Switching and signaling gateways
 Tellium, November 2003, Metro optical transport
 Eluminant, February 2003, Access and transmission products
 vpacket, July 2002, VoIP
 Nortel Networks Access Node, August 2001, Digital loop carrier (DLC)
 xybridge, February 2001, Softswitch
 Optaphone Systems,	February 2000, Wireless
 Roundview	February 2000, IP and derived voice
 Premisys, December 1999, Integrated access solutions
 CAG Technologies, November 1999, Manufacturing

In April 2015, the company announced its decision to merge with Korean DASAN Network Solutions. The deal involved Zhone purchasing DASAN and then granting 58% of the company's shares to DASAN management. The merger was completed in September 2016, creating DASAN Zhone Solutions, which was soon renamed DZS.

Zhone Building
The Zhone Building at 7001 Oakport Street is a prominent detached building, next to Interstate 880 in East Oakland.  The 66th Street exit was renamed "Zhone Way" west of 880, leading to Oakport.  The building were the headquarters of Zhone, until they moved to a smaller building behind it at 7005 Oakport, and then eventually to Plano, Texas.

In March 2020, DZS announced that it will move its company headquarters to Plano, TX.  The building at 7001 Oakport Street is now called the Arena Center, and has a few tenants, including the Oakland Drive-Through Food Pantry and the Alameda County Registrar of Voters.

Products 
Zhone's SkyZHone Metro Wi-Fi System is approved by the Rural Utilities Service for use in rural areas.

References

External links
  

Manufacturing companies based in Oakland, California
Telecommunications equipment vendors
Networking hardware companies
Networking companies of the United States
Companies listed on the Nasdaq
American companies established in 1999